Erich Massini (13 September 1889 – 26 July 1915) was a German international footballer.

References

1889 births
1915 deaths
Association football defenders
German footballers
Germany international footballers
BFC Preussen players
German military personnel killed in World War I